The 2001–02 season was Juventus Football Club's 104th in existence and 100th consecutive season in the top flight of Italian football. Juventus ended a three-year drought of league titles, following a remarkable turnaround in fortunes during the final days of the season, when Inter suffered from a collapse of nerves in the closing stages. On the final day of the league season, Juventus won 2–0 away from home against Udinese, while Inter fell at Lazio 4–2, despite leading twice. That handed Juventus its 26th Serie A title, and made up for the disappointing exit from the second group stage in the UEFA Champions League.

As for individual players, the season saw new goalkeeper Gianluigi Buffon claiming a stature as the best keeper in the world, while David Trezeguet got his Serie A breakthrough, sharing the topscoring title with Dario Hübner of Piacenza. Alessandro Del Piero also played a crucial part in the success, scoring 16 goals.

Apart from Buffon, pre-season saw three significant signings. Lilian Thuram came from Parma along with Buffon, but failed to establish himself as centre-back and ended up on the right wing-back position. Pavel Nedvěd came from Lazio as a replacement for departed Zinedine Zidane after Pavel Nedvěd snubbed Manchester United, and performed at an acceptable level, without finding the form he had shown a few years before. Fellow Lazio signing Marcelo Salas was however a major flop, because of a serious cruciate ligament injury he suffered during a scoreless draw at Bologna, which kept him away for almost the entire season; a talented and prolific goalscorer in his prime, Salas was subsequently plagued by injuries and his career was never the same again. 

The sale of Zinedine Zidane to Real Madrid of Spain from Juventus, was the world football transfer record at the time, costing the Spanish club around €75 million. The intake of Gianluigi Buffon from Parma cost Juventus €45 million, making it the most expensive transfer for a goalkeeper of all-time.

Players

Squad information

Transfers

Left club during season

Reserve squad

Competitions

Serie A

League table

Results summary

Results by round

Matches

Coppa Italia

Round of 16

Quarter-finals

Semi-finals

Final

UEFA Champions League

Group stage

Second group stage

Statistics

Appearances and goals
Not including Coppa Italia appearances

|-
! colspan=14 style=background:#dcdcdc; text-align:center| Players transferred out during the season

References

Juventus F.C. seasons
Juventus
Italian football championship-winning seasons